Dmitry Alekseyev (born 31 January 1966) is a Soviet and Russian luger. He competed in the men's doubles event at the 1988 Winter Olympics. He won the bronze medal in the men's doubles event at the 1985 FIL World Luge Championships in Oberhof, East Germany.

References

External links
 
 
 

1966 births
Living people
Soviet male lugers
Russian male lugers
Olympic lugers of the Soviet Union
Lugers at the 1988 Winter Olympics
Sportspeople from Moscow